The 2020–21 FC Twente season was the club's 56th season in existence and second consecutive season in the top flight of Dutch football. In addition to the domestic league, FC Twente participated in this season's edition of the KNVB Cup. The season covered the period from 1 July 2020 to 30 June 2021.

Players

First-team squad

Out on loan

Transfers

Transfers in

Out

Pre-season and friendlies

Competitions

Overview

Eredivisie

League table

Results summary

Results by round

Matches
The league fixtures were announced on 24 July 2020.

KNVB Cup

References

External links

FC Twente seasons
FC Twente